Braulio Castillo Cintrón (March 30, 1933 – February 28, 2015) was a telenovela actor in Latin America. His two sons, Braulio Castillo, Jr. and Jorge Castillo, are also actors. He was born in Bayamón, Puerto Rico.

Castillo played in the Orquesta Mandolina in Puerto Rico, before working as an actor. He graduated from the University of Puerto Rico with a major in the performing arts. He had roles in Puerto Rican television soap operas, during the 1950s, including El derecho de nacer; he worked at Telemundo
Puerto Rico productions.

Castillo later relocated to Peru, where he performed the leading role in the telenovela, "Simplemente María" ("Simply Mary"), with Peruvian actress Saby Kamalich. There, Castillo was the first MC of the international children's puppet show based on the Italian fictional character of Topo Gigio.

He then moved to Mexico during the 1960s, and performed in Mexican films such as "El Cielo y Tu" ("Heaven and You"), among others, and working in several Televisa productions.

In 1970 Castillo was hit in the head by a rock, while filming a scene for a movie. He survived, but retired from the entertainment business. He still occasionally made appearances on television.

He died at the age of 81 of natural causes at Santa Teresa Jornet elderly home in Trujillo Alto, Puerto Rico. He was buried at Porta Coeli Cemetery in Bayamón, Puerto Rico.

See also

List of Puerto Ricans

External links

References 

1933 births
2015 deaths
People from Bayamón, Puerto Rico
Puerto Rican male film actors
Puerto Rican male soap opera actors
Puerto Rican male television actors
Puerto Rican male telenovela actors
University of Puerto Rico alumni